Nevasa Assembly constituency is one of the 288 Vidhan Sabha (Legislative Assembly) constituencies of Maharashtra state in Western India.
2009 MLA Shankarrao Gadakh

Overview
Nevasa (constituency number 221) is one of the twelve Vidhan Sabha constituencies located in the Ahmednagar district. It covers the entire Nevasa tehsil of the district.

Nevasa is part of the Shirdi Lok Sabha constituency along with five other Vidhan Sabha segments in this district, namely Sangamner, Shirdi, Kopargaon, Shrirampur and Akole.

Members of Legislative Assembly
2009; Shankarrao Gadakh Patil Nationalist Congress Party
2014; Balasaheb Alias Dadasaheb Damodhar Murkute Bharatiya Janata Party
2019; Shankarrao Gadakh Patil Krantikari Shetkari Paksh-Shiv Sena

See also
 Nevasa
 List of constituencies of the Maharashtra Legislative Assembly

References

Assembly constituencies of Maharashtra
Ahmednagar district
Year of establishment missing